Hugh Bradley (May 23, 1885 – January 26, 1949), born in Grafton, Massachusetts, played first base in Major League Baseball from 1910 to 1915. On April 26, 1912, he hit the first ever home run at Fenway Park.  As a backup first baseman for the 1912 World Series champion Boston Red Sox, Bradley got off to a hot start to the season and had a chance to supplant manager Jake Stahl as the regular at the position, but his hitting fell off dramatically as the season went on. Bradley died on January 26, 1949, in Worcester, Massachusetts.

References

Sources

Major League Baseball first basemen
1885 births
1949 deaths
Baseball players from Massachusetts
Boston Red Sox players
Pittsburgh Rebels players
Brooklyn Tip-Tops players
Newark Peppers players
Worcester Busters players
Jersey City Skeeters players
Toronto Maple Leafs (International League) players
Columbus Senators players
Omaha Rourkes players
Galveston Pirates players
Houston Buffaloes players
New Orleans Pelicans (baseball) players
Nashville Vols players
St. Petersburg Saints players
Minor league baseball managers